Cladonia arbuscula or the shrubby cup lichen is a species of cup lichen in the Cladoniaceae family.

Taxonomy

Name
The species name "arbuscula" is Latin for the word "bush" or "shrub", which may be due to the fact that the lichen has branches that resemble a bush.

Subspecies
C. arbuscula has 6 subspecies:

 Cladonia arbuscula subsp. arbuscula (Wallr.) Flot.
 Cladonia arbuscula subsp. beringiana Ahti
 Cladonia arbuscula subsp. boliviana (Ahti) Ahti & De Priest
 Cladonia arbuscula subsp. imshaugii (Ahti) Ahti & De Priest
 Cladonia arbuscula subsp. mitis (Sandst.) Ruoss
 Cladonia arbuscula subsp. pachyderma (Ahti) Ahti & De Priest

Ecology
Cladonia arbuscula is a known host species for the fungus Lichenopeltella cladoniarum.

References

arbuscula